MeCard is a data file similar to vCard but used by NTT DoCoMo in Japan in QR code format for use with Cellular Phones.

It is largely compatible with most QR-readers for smartphones. It is an easy way to share a contact with the most used fields. Usually, devices can recognize it and treat it like a contact ready to import.

The following QR Code image is an example containing the text: MECARD:N:Doe,John;TEL:13035551212;EMAIL:john.doe@example.com;;

Advantages 
Its main advantage is the simplicity: It is very intuitive.

It is based in UTF-8 (which is ASCII compatible), the fields are separated with one semicolon (";"), the tags are very readable, they are separated with a colon (":") and --maybe the most important reason-- compared with vCard it needs very few chars which is important for the size of a QR Code.

Limitations 
Compared to vCard, MeCard format only stores one single contact, a few labels, and a few data pieces to be set in a typical phonebook.

Structure 
MeCard format starts with the tag "MECARD:" and it finishes with two semicolons (";;")

The supported tags include:

External links 
 
 QR Code MeCard online generator
 MECARD QR code generator

Computer file formats
Automatic identification and data capture
Barcodes